Dicistroviridae is a family of viruses in the order Picornavirales. Invertebrates, including aphids, leafhoppers, flies, bees, ants, and silkworms, serve as natural hosts. There are 15 species in this family, assigned to three genera. Diseases associated with this family include: DCV: increased reproductive potential. extremely pathogenic when injected with high associated mortality. CrPV: paralysis and death.

Taxonomy

Although many dicistroviruses were initially placed in the Picornaviridae, they have since been reclassified into their own family. The name (Dicistro) is derived from the characteristic dicistronic arrangement of the genome.

This family is a member of the Order Picornavirales (along with the families Iflaviridae, Picornaviridae, and Secoviridae and Marnaviridae). Within this order, the gene order is the gene order of the nonstructural proteins Hel(helicase)-Pro(protease)-RdRp(polymerase). The Dicistroviridae can be distinguished from the members of the taxa by the location of their structural protein genes at the 3' end rather than the 5' end (as found in Iflavirus, Picornaviridae and Secoviridae) and by having two genomic segments rather than a single one (as in the Comovirus).

The family contains the following genera and species:

Genus: Aparavirus
Acute bee paralysis virus
Israeli acute paralysis virus
Kashmir bee virus
Mud crab virus
Solenopsis invicta virus 1
Taura syndrome virus
Genus: Cripavirus
Aphid lethal paralysis virus
Cricket paralysis virus
Drosophila C virus
Rhopalosiphum padi virus
Genus: Triatovirus
Black queen cell virus
Himetobi P virus
Homalodisca coagulata virus-1
Plautia stali intestine virus
Triatoma virus

Linepithema humile virus 1 is possibly a member of Dicistroviridae, of unclear placement.

Structure

Viruses in Dicistroviridae are non-enveloped, with icosahedral geometries, and T=pseudo3 symmetry. The diameter is around 30 nm. Genomes are linear and non-segmented, around 8.5-10.2kb in length. The genome has 2 open reading frames.

Life cycle
Entry into the host cell is achieved by penetration into the host cell. Replication follows the positive stranded RNA virus replication model. Positive stranded RNA virus transcription is the method of transcription. Translation takes place by viral initiation, and  ribosomal skipping. Invertebrates serve as the natural host. Transmission routes are contamination.

RNA structural elements
Many of the Dicistroviridae genomes contains structured RNA elements. For example, the Cripaviruses have an internal ribosome entry site, which mimics a Met-tRNA and is used in the initiation of translation.

References

Hunter, WB, Katsar, CS, Chaparro, JX. 2006. Molecular analysis of capsid protein of Homalodisca coagulata virus-1, a new leafhopper-infecting virus from the glassy-winged sharpshooter, Homalodisca coagulata. Journal of Insect Science 6:31
Hunnicutt, LE, Hunter, WB, Cave RD, Powell, CA, Mozoruk, JJ. 2006. Genome sequence and molecular characterization of Homalodisca coagulata virus-1, a novel virus discovered in the glassy-winged sharpshooter (Hemiptera: Cicadellidae). Virology 350: 67–78
Valles, SM, Strong, CA, Dang, PM, Hunter, WB, Pereira, RM, Oi, DH, Shapiro, AM, Williams, DF. 2004. A picorna-like virus from the red imported fire ant, Solenopsis invicta: initial discovery, genome sequence, and characterization. Virology 328: 151–157

External links
 'ICTV Online (10th) Report: Dicistroviridae''
 Viralzone: Dicistroviridae
 Beediseases Honey bee diseases website by Dr. Guido Cordoni.

 
Picornavirales
Virus families